Johnny Gratan Vaea Taione is a Tongan politician and Member of the Legislative Assembly of Tonga. He is the younger brother of former MP Sione Taione.

Taione was first elected to Parliament in the 2023 Tongatapu 8 by-election. He had previously run as a candidate in Tongatapu 8 in the 2021 Tongan general election.

References

Living people
Members of the Legislative Assembly of Tonga
Year of birth missing (living people)